"Can't Take Any More" is a song by Australian hard rock band the Angels, released in April 1987 as the fourth and final single from their eighth studio album Howling. "Can't Take Any More" peaked at number 63 on the Kent Music Report.

Track listings 
7-inch single (Mushroom K258)
 Can't Take Any More (Richard Brewster, Brent Eccles) - 3:21
 Stonewall (John Brewster, Brent Eccles, Richard Brewster) - 4:11
12-inch single
 Can't Take Any More (Brent Eccles, Richard Brewster) - 3:21
 Stonewall (John Brewster, Brent Eccles, Richard Brewster) - 4:11
 All Night For You (Doc Neeson, Mark Lieb) - 3:20

Personnel 
 Doc Neeson – lead vocals
 Rick Brewster – lead guitar
 Bob Spencer – rhythm guitar, backing vocals
 Jim Hilbun – bass guitar, sax, backing vocals
 Brent Eccles – drums
 Eddie Rayner – keyboards
 Mary Azzopardi – backing vocals on "Hide Your Face" and "Can't Take Anymore"
 Bridget O'Donoghue – backing vocals on "Hide Your Face" and "Can't Take Anymore"

Production
 Steve Brown – producer
 Andrew Scott – engineer
 Al Wright – engineer
 Heidi Cannova – assistant engineer
 Bill Price – mixing
 Deitmar – mixing assistant

Charts

References 

The Angels (Australian band) songs
Mushroom Records singles
1987 singles
1987 songs